Ray Gilbert (September 5, 1912 – March 3, 1976) was an American lyricist. He grew up in Hartford, Connecticut.

Career
Gilbert is best remembered for the lyrics to the Oscar-winning song "Zip-a-Dee-Doo-Dah" from the film Song of the South, which he wrote with Allie Wrubel in 1947. He also wrote American English lyrics for the songs in The Three Caballeros featuring Donald Duck. He also wrote the English lyrics of the Andy Williams' 1965 hit, "...and Roses and Roses", and "Lost in Your Love" with Sidney Miller, to music by Bert Jay.

Gilbert also wrote the English lyrics for a number of songs composed by Antonio Carlos Jobim, including "Dindi," ""Amor em Paz" ("Once I Loved"), and "Inútil Paisagem" ("Useless Landscape"/"If You Never Come to Me").

He married actress Janis Paige in 1962.

References

External links

1912 births
1976 deaths
American lyricists
Songwriters from Connecticut
RCA Victor artists
Best Original Song Academy Award-winning songwriters
Musicians from Hartford, Connecticut
20th-century American musicians
Songwriters from New York (state)
Walt Disney Animation Studios people